Andrea Grimberg Lignell (born 28 August 2000) is a Swedish amateur golfer. She won the 2021 NCAA Championship with Ole Miss.

Career
Lignell grew up in Gothenburg and represents Hills Golf Club. She was runner-up at the 2017 Swedish Junior Strokeplay Championship and won the event back-to-back in 2020 and 2021.

Drafted to the National Team, she won bronze both at the 2018 European Girls' Team Championship and also at the 2018 Junior Golf World Cup in Japan, together with Kajsa Arwefjäll and Ingrid Lindblad. In 2021, she helped Sweden place third at The Spirit International Amateur Golf Championship. She won the silver at the 2021 European Ladies' Team Championship together with Linn Grant, Sara Kjellker, Ingrid Lindblad, Maja Stark and Beatrice Wallin, after finishing her match against Emily Toy in the final all square.

Lignell graduated high school in 2019 and accepted an athletic scholarship to University of Mississippi, and started playing with the Ole Miss Rebels women's golf team the same fall. As a sophomore, her team won the 2021 NCAA Championship, Ole Miss' first team title in a women's sport. Lignell, who played 40 holes over the quarterfinals and semifinals, drained a five-footer on the 17th hole to clinch the win for Ole Miss over an Oklahoma State team which included her compatriot Maja Stark.

Amateur wins
2014 Skandia Tour Regional #2 Bohuslän/Dal, Skandia Cup Riksfinal F14
2015 Skandia Tour Riks #6 Göteborg, Lexus Junior Tour Masters
2016 Skandia Cup Riksfinal F16
2017 Partille Open, Ringenäs Junior Open, Junior Masters Invitational Final
2018 Stenson Sunesson Junior Challenge
2020 Swedish Junior Strokeplay Championship
2021 Swedish Junior Strokeplay Championship

Source:

Team appearances
Amateur
European Girls' Team Championship (representing Sweden): 2018
Toyota Junior Golf World Cup (representing Sweden): 2018
European Ladies' Team Championship (representing Sweden): 2021, 2022
The Spirit International Amateur Golf Championship (representing Sweden): 2021

Source:

References

External links

Swedish female golfers
Amateur golfers
Ole Miss Rebels women's golfers
Sportspeople from Gothenburg
2000 births
Living people